Harpalus inconcinnus is a species of ground beetle in the subfamily Harpalinae. It was described by Maximilien Chaudoir in 1876.

References

inconcinnus
Beetles described in 1876